Anthracosaurus is an extinct genus of embolomere, a possible distant relative of reptiles that lived during the Late Carboniferous (around 310 million years ago) in what is now Scotland and England. Anthracosaurus probably inhabited swamps, rivers and lakes. Its name is Greek for "coal lizard".

The genus was named by Thomas Henry Huxley when James Russell, a mining surveyor, sent him the first specimens.

References

External links
 Classification of Anthracosaurus

Embolomeres
Carboniferous reptiliomorphs
Basal tetrapods of Europe